The Carniolan honey bee (Apis mellifera carnica, Pollmann) is a subspecies of the western honey bee. The Carniolan honey bee is native to Slovenia, southern Austria, and parts of Croatia, Bosnia and Herzegovina, Montenegro, Serbia, Hungary, Romania, and Bulgaria.

Origin
The Carniolan honey bee is a subspecies of the Western honey bee, that has naturalised and adapted to the Kočevje (Gottschee) sub-region of Carniola (Slovenia), the southern part of the Austrian Alps, Dinarides region, southern Pannonian plain and the northern Balkans.  These bees are known as Carniolans, or "Carnies" for short, in English. At present this subspecies is the second most popular among beekeepers (after the Italian bee).

Qualities
It is favored among beekeepers for several reasons, not the least being its ability to defend itself successfully against insect pests while at the same time being extremely gentle in its behavior toward beekeepers. These bees are particularly adept at adjusting worker population to nectar availability.  It relies on these rapid adjustments of population levels to rapidly expand worker bee populations after nectar becomes available in the spring, and, again, to rapidly cut off brood production when nectar ceases to be available in quantity. It meets periods of high nectar with high worker populations and consequently stores large quantities of honey and pollen during those periods. They are resistant to some diseases and parasites that can debilitate hives of other subspecies.

Anatomy and appearance
Carniolan honey bees are about the same size as the Italian honey bee, but they are physically distinguished by their generally dusky brown-grey color that is relieved by stripes of a subdued lighter brown color. Their chitin is dark, but it is possible to find lighter colored or brown colored rings and dots on their bodies. They are also known as the "grey bee".

Carniolan bees are nearly as big and long as the Western European black bees, though their abdomens are much slimmer. Furthermore, the Carniolan bee has a very long tongue (6.5 to 6.7 mm, which is very well adapted for clover), a very high elbow joint and very short hair.

Character and behavior

Strengths
Gentle and non-aggressive
Can be kept in populated areas
Better sense of orientation relative to the Italian honey bee
Less drifting of bees from one hive to a neighboring hive
Not as prone to robbing from other hives relative to the Italian honey bee
Able to overwinter in smaller numbers of winter bees
Thrifty during Winter, conserving honey stores
Able to quickly adapt to changes in the environment
Good for areas with longer winters
Fast rhythm of brood production and then brood rearing reduction when available forage decreases 
Lower use of propolis
Increased resistance to brood diseases
Good build up for areas with strong spring nectar flow and early pollination
Forage earlier in the morning and later in the evening, and on cooler, wetter days
Workers live up to 12% longer than other sub-species

See also 

Anton Janša

References

External links
Slovenian beekeeper webpage
APILAB Centre of innovative technologies - House of Carniolan bee

Western honey bee breeds
Hymenoptera of Europe
Animal breeds originating in Slovenia
Beekeeping in Slovenia